The 7th constituency of Yvelines is a French legislative constituency in the Yvelines département.

Description

The 7th constituency of Yvelines is the north of the department with the Seine running through it.

Whilst the seat has elected conservatives since the 1993 defeat of former Prime Minister of France Michel Rocard it remains relatively marginal. The UMP candidate Arnaud Richard won the seat by less than 500 votes at the 2012 election.

Historic Representation

Election results

2022

 
 
 
 
 
 
 
|-
| colspan="8" bgcolor="#E9E9E9"|
|-

2017

 
 
 
 
 
 
 
|-
| colspan="8" bgcolor="#E9E9E9"|
|-

2012

 
 
 
 
 
 
 
|-
| colspan="8" bgcolor="#E9E9E9"|
|-

2007

 
 
 
 
 
 
 
|-
| colspan="8" bgcolor="#E9E9E9"|
|-

2002

 
 
 
 
 
|-
| colspan="8" bgcolor="#E9E9E9"|
|-

1997

 
 
 
 
 
 
 
|-
| colspan="8" bgcolor="#E9E9E9"|
|-

Sources
Official results of French elections from 2002: "Résultats électoraux officiels en France" (in French).

7